James Edward "Joe" Marston  (7 January 1926 – 29 November 2015) was an Australian association football player who became the first Australian to appear in a FA Cup Final when he turned out for Preston North End in their 1954 defeat to West Bromwich Albion.

Biography

Marston was 28 when he played at Wembley Stadium alongside Tom Finney and Tommy Docherty. After the War, Marston had played for Leichhardt-Annandale in Division 1 of the New South Wales State League, supplementing his income by working as a painter and life-guard.

In December 1949, Marston received correspondence from a scout in England who had watched him play, informing him that Preston wished to offer him a trial.  Their interest was such that they paid for Marston's wife, Edith, to join him on the journey to England.

Marston spent time in the reserves, until an injury to Harry Mattinson enabled him to get a run in the first team during the Second Division title season in 1951 and losing out to Arsenal for the 1952–53 season on goal average; remaining at centre-half at Deepdale as an ever-present until 1954, making 154 appearances and being selected for the Football League side against the Scottish Football League XI.  Marston eventually returned to Australia in 1956 because of homesickness, despite pleas from Preston to stay. Marston was also the target of a purported 80,000 pound transfer offer made by Arsenal.

International career
Marston was an Australian football international appearing for the Socceroos during Blackpool's 1958 tour of Australia in which Stanley Matthews appeared; and appearing and coaching the national side during Hearts tour of the country in 1959.

Retirement
Joe Marston and his wife Edith retired on the New South Wales Central Coast and maintained their passionate interest in association football.

Recognition
Marston was awarded an MBE (1980) and an Australian Sports Medal (2000) for services to his sport. He was inducted into the Sport Australia Hall of Fame in 1988.

Marston is an inductee into the NSW Hall of Champions. In September 2008, he was a recipient of one of the two inaugural Alex Tobin Medals awarded by the Australian Professional Footballers Association. The Joe Marston Medal, awarded to the man of the match in the A-League and National Soccer League grand finals, was named in his honour. In January 2012, Marston was featured on a postage stamp issued by Australia Post in a series commemorating notable Australian footballers from several codes.

Death
On 29 November 2015, it was announced that Marston had died of natural causes after having been in frail health for a while.

References

External links
Oz Football profile
Sydney Morning Herald obituary

1926 births
2015 deaths
Australia international soccer players
Australia national soccer team managers
Australian expatriate soccer players
Australian expatriate sportspeople in England
Australian Members of the Order of the British Empire
Australian soccer coaches
Australian soccer players
Preston North End F.C. players
Recipients of the Australian Sports Medal
Sport Australia Hall of Fame inductees
Sydney Olympic FC managers
English Football League players
English Football League representative players
Association football defenders
FA Cup Final players